Dar Chaabane  (full name Dar Chaabane El Fehri) is a town and a commune in the Nabeul Governorate, Tunisia on the coast of Cap Bon. In 2014, its population was 42,140. The municipality is the result of a merger in 1957 between the town of El Fehri located on the coast and the town of Dar Chaabane located in the hinterland. Covering 3500 hectares, the city is one of the biggest towns of the peninsula of Cap Bon.

History

Dar Chaabane was founded in the year 53 AH (7th century) by Chaabane Mechmech, a warlord of the Muslim Army in the Cap Bon region. He built a citadel in the town around which members of his family came to live, whence the name of Dar Chaabane or "the House of Chaabane". In the year 334 AH (10th century), Ahmed Fehri El Ansari, a native of Seguia el-Hamra in Morocco, settled a few kilometers away from Dar Chaabane and married a descendant of the commander Mechmech. With the newcomers, their progeny later founded the town of Zaouiet El Fehri.

Dar Chaabane's history is linked to the arrival of Andalusian Moors, expelled from Spain during the Reconquista in the 15th century.

See also
List of cities in Tunisia

References

Populated places in Tunisia
Communes of Tunisia
Tunisia geography articles needing translation from French Wikipedia